According to the 2021 census, the City of Edmonton had a population of 1,010,899 residents, compared to 4,262,635 for all of Alberta, Canada.  The total population of the Edmonton census metropolitan area (CMA) was 1,418,118, making it the sixth-largest CMA in Canada.

Growth and density 
In the five years between 2016 and 2021, the population of the City of Edmonton grew by 8.3%, compared with an increase of 7.3% for the Edmonton CMA and 10.8% for Alberta as a whole.

Age and gender 
In mid-2006, 11.9% of Edmonton's population were of retirement age (65 and over for males and females) compared with 13.7% in Canada. The median age was 35.3 years of age, compared to 37.6 years of age for all of Canada. Also, according to the 2006 census, 50.5% of the population within the City of Edmonton were female, while 49.5% were male. Children under five accounted for approximately 5.6% of the resident population of Edmonton. This compares with 6.2% in Alberta, and almost 5.2% for Canada overall.

Ethnic origin

Metro Edmonton 

Note: Totals greater than 100% due to multiple origin responses.

Future projections

City of Edmonton 
In 2016, people of Canadian origin make up the largest ethnic cluster in Edmonton. 
Since 2011, visible minorities accounted for over 30% of the population, while more than 5% of Edmontonians were considered Aboriginal.

Note: Totals greater than 100% due to multiple origin responses.

Language

Metro Edmonton 
The question on knowledge of languages allows for multiple responses. The following figures are from the 2021 Canadian Census, and lists languages that were selected by at least 1,000 respondents.

Religion

City of Edmonton 
The 2021 National Household Survey identified 44.6% of Edmontonians as Christian, while 31.1% of residents were identified as having no religion.

 Statistics Canada. 2013. Alberta (Code 48) (table). National Household Survey (NHS) Profile. 2011 National Household Survey. Statistics Canada Catalogue no. 99-004-XWE. Ottawa. Released September 11, 2013.
 All percentages are rounded to nearest 0.1%.

See also 
Demographics of Alberta
Demographics of Calgary
List of neighbourhoods in Edmonton
List of oldest Edmontonians

References

External links 
Alberta Municipal Affairs – Municipal Census & Population Lists
City of Edmonton
Municipal Census Results
Population History

Edmonton
Edmonton